Steveston Exchange is a transit exchange serving the Steveston village area of Richmond, British Columbia, Canada. Buses have served the area since the late 1950s but Steveston was not indicated on system maps as an exchange until 2013. It was given an official exchange designation on September 7, 2020. There are 5 routes that connect to various areas of the region, such as Brighouse, Riverport and Vancouver.

Routes
The following routes serve the exchange:

See also
List of bus routes in Metro Vancouver

References

TransLink (British Columbia) bus stations